Pirates of the Caribbean is a dark ride at Disneyland, Walt Disney World's Magic Kingdom, Tokyo Disneyland, Disneyland Park at Disneyland Paris, and Shanghai Disneyland.

The ride tells the story of a band of pirates in the West Indies islands around the Caribbean Sea in the 17th and 18th centuries with the saga of their voyages, troubles, and exploits. The original version of the ride opened at the Disneyland in Anaheim, California, near Los Angeles, in 1967, and was the last ride whose construction was envisioned and personally overseen by Walt Disney, who died three months before it opened. After immense popularity, the ride was replicated seven years later at the Magic Kingdom of Walt Disney World, near Orlando, Florida in 1973. Versions followed at Tokyo Disneyland in 1983, and at Disneyland Paris in 1992. Each of the initial four versions of the ride has a different façade but a similar ride experience. A reimagined version of the ride influenced by the visitors' familiarity with the worldwide success of the feature film series, Pirates of the Caribbean: Battle for the Sunken Treasure, opened at the Shanghai Disneyland Park in 2016.

The Pirates of the Caribbean ride gave rise to the song "Yo Ho (A Pirate's Life for Me)" written by George Bruns and Xavier Atencio, and performed on the ride's recording by The Mellomen. The ride became the basis for the Pirates of the Caribbean film series, which debuted in 2003. Since 2006, Disney has incorporated characters from the film series into the Disneyland, Magic Kingdom, Tokyo Disneyland, and Disneyland Paris versions of the rides.

History

Opening on March 18, 1967, the Disneyland version of Pirates of the Caribbean was the last ride that Walt Disney himself participated in designing, debuting three months after his death. It is located within the New Orleans Square portion of Disneyland, its facade evoking antebellum era New Orleans, topped by a 31-star United States flag (which would indicate the 1850s). It was originally envisioned as a walk-through wax museum; however, with the success of the boat ride concept of It's a Small World at the 1964 New York World's Fair, Disney decided to employ the same ride system on the Pirates of the Caribbean. The ornate initials of Walt Disney and Roy Disney (W.D. and R.D.) can be seen entwined in the wrought iron railings above the ride's entrance at Disneyland. An overhead sign at the boat dock names it for the famous pirate Jean Lafitte (although his name is spelled Laffite as the pirate himself originally spelled it, rather than with the English spelling which has now become standard), who fought alongside the U.S. Army at the Battle of New Orleans in the War of 1812. The second floor of the facade was originally designed to be a private Disney family apartment. However, it later opened in spring 1987 as an art-related retail/museum space called the Disney Gallery and was replaced in late 2007 by the Disneyland Dream Suite.

The original installation at Disneyland was manufactured by Arrow Development and Arrow consulted on the next two installations. The ride's passenger carrying boats are very similar to those in a patent assigned to Walt Disney Productions, but filed by Edgar A. Morgan, one of the founders of Arrow Development. Arrow participated in the design and development of many rides at Disneyland from 1953.

There are 630,000 gallons of water, 53 audio-animatronic animals and birds, and 75 audio-animatronic pirates and villagers in the ride, and it takes three days to empty and refill the "bayou" for renovations. Across from the boarding area within the ride is the Blue Bayou Restaurant, made to look like the backyard dinner party of a southern plantation. The restaurant opened the same day as the ride, and is considered one of the original theme restaurants.

The debut of Magic Kingdom at Walt Disney World in 1971 brought many popular rides from Disneyland to the East Coast, but Pirates of the Caribbean was not among them. As the Caribbean region is geographically located near Florida, it was thought a Caribbean-themed ride would not hold the same mystique as it did in California. Instead, the Western River Expedition with Big Thunder Mountain would replace the ride with a similar boat ride and other rides. But Walt Disney World visitors were vocal in their disappointment at the missing ride, leading Disney to quickly announce a Florida version instead of the Western River Expedition. The new Pirates of the Caribbean ride opened on December 15, 1973. Additional iterations of Pirates of the Caribbean later opened at Disney parks in Tokyo, Paris, and Shanghai.

The opening of the Disney Gallery in 1987 also coincided with the ride's outside queue area being completely redone to improve traffic flows. A bridge walkway was built in front of the entrance to allow crowds to pass through New Orleans Square without causing traffic jams with the guests waiting in line for the ride.

Ride description

Walt Disney's original ride 
The following is a detailed summary of what appears in the original Disneyland version of the Pirates of the Caribbean ride, from 1967 to 2006. An episode of Walt Disney's Wonderful World Of Color shows Walt Disney during the conception stage as well as presenting footage of the ride's opening day. Further details of the history and behind the scenes of the attraction were chronicled in the 2005 book, Pirates of the Caribbean: From the Magic Kingdom to the Movies by Jason Surrell.

The ride begins amid glimmering fireflies during an evening in a Louisiana bayou. Riders board their boats at Laffite's Landing and are at once afloat in the heart of bayou country. Banjo melodies (including "Oh! Susanna" and "Camptown Races") can be heard as guests pass by houseboats, one of whose porches features an old man calmly rocking back and forth in his rocking chair and smoking a pipe. Above a stone archway, a talking skull with crossed swords provides words of warning before the guests' boat takes a plunge down a waterfall into a dimly lit cavernous passage, where voices can be heard singing the theme song.

After a second plunge further into the depths of an underground grotto known as Dead Man's Cove, guests behold the skeletal remains of an unfortunate band of pirates, guarding their loot and treasure with macabre delight. During this section, a voice can be heard repeating the phrase "Dead men tell no tales!" The boats glide gently past an old pirate shipwreck, though the helmsman is nothing more than a skeleton doomed to pilot the ship through a thunderstorm. Moving onward, the crew's quarters are complete with skeletal pirates frozen in time – playing chess and drinking rum, one skeleton drinking a bottomless bottle through an exposed rib cage. The Captain's Quarters features a bony corpse examining a treasure map in bed, while an old harpsichord plays the theme song, and a huge amount of treasure being guarded by another skeleton pirate. As guests continue through an empty, dark tunnel, two ominous voices boom from above warning of the cursed treasure and what lies ahead.

Once guests are out of the tunnel, cannonballs whistle overhead and explosions throw water into the air – a fierce battle in the Caribbean between a marauding pirate galleon, the Wicked Wench, and a Spanish fortress is in full swing. From the deck of the Wicked Wench, the Pirate Captain (modeled on Blackbeard's appearance) leads the assault as colonial defenders can be seen manning the fort's cannons, barking orders to each other in Spanish and shouting threats at the invading pirates. The village of Puerto Dorado on Isla Tesoro is overrun with pirates in search of treasure. The first sight is the town square, where some pirates have kidnapped the mayor, Carlos, and threaten to drown him in a well if he does not divulge the location of the treasure. Carlos' wife peeks out of an upstairs window, telling him to be brave and not talk; she is shot at as Carlos is repeatedly dunked in the water while a line of other captive city officials look on. An auction scene follows, where an auctioneer pirate tries to sell off the local women with the banner, "Take a Wench for a Bride!" The bidders yell out for the "redhead", a flirtatious woman in a red dress. In the next scene, women are being chased through town by pirates. The "Pooped Pirate" reminisces about the "lively lassie" he wished to "hoist his colors" upon. Holding her slip as he prattles on, the woman peers out from inside a barrel that sat right behind the pirate's back as he keeps boasting, unaware.

Riders then watch carefree, tipsy pirates sing Yo Ho (A Pirate's Life for Me) as they succeed in ravaging the town and setting it aflame, filling the night air with an orange glow. Others wallow in the mud, one pirate in particular sleeping with pigs, and a pirate named Old Bill offering rum to stray cats. The boats next float past a dungeon where imprisoned pirates are doing their best to escape as flames draw near. A small dog just out of the prisoners' reach holds the key to their escape in his teeth; he seems all but immune to the pleas of the pirates trying to coax him closer. One of the pirates holds a noose, hoping to trap the dog. Timbers are smoldering and cracking overhead as riders sail through a storage room filled with gunpowder, cannonballs, and rum-filled, gun-shooting pirates continue singing. A shootout between the inebriated crew and captain of the pirate ship in a flaming ammunition warehouse threatens to demolish the entire village. Finally, at the end of the ride, the boats proceed up a lift hill and reach the top of the hill and spill back into the sleepy bayou where the journey began.

Disneyland 
Pirates of the Caribbean at Disneyland has gone through many changes and refurbishments over the years, but the ride itself remains the same. Among the changes made was the addition of references to the film franchise, some which have made it to other parks.

The Aztec chest from Pirates of the Caribbean: The Curse of the Black Pearl sits in the corner of the Treasure Room and is the last thing guests see before entering a dark tunnel, where the boats encounter another pirate skeleton, sitting in a booby trap and clutching a treasure chest, which appears to transform before the riders' eyes into a flesh-and-blood living pirate, indicating a transition back in time. Captain Barbossa replaces the original Pirate Captain of the Wicked Wench, leading the pirate galleon's assault on the Spanish fort and threatens to burn the city to the ground unless they surrender Captain Jack Sparrow.

The village of Puerto Dorado on Isla Tesoro is overrun with pirates in search of treasure and Captain Jack Sparrow. A group of pirates start dunking the mayor, Carlos, while Jack is seen hiding behind some dresses. The auction scene follows, where an auctioneer pirate tries to sell off loot from the townspeople to other pirates. A female pirate, Redd, is more interested in the town's rum supply, as are the bidders, who ignore the chickens that are currently offered for bidding. In the next scene, pirates run around chasing women holding trays of food, and two buccaneers who have stolen food are chased by an angry woman holding a rolling pin. Just beyond is the "Pooped Pirate" drunkenly waving a map and key to a treasure vault, boasting that Captain Jack Sparrow will never see it. However, Jack is hiding in a barrel just behind him, popping out and getting a good look at the map over the pirate's shoulder as he keeps boasting, unaware.

At the end of the ride, Captain Jack Sparrow is seen in a room full of the hidden treasure (the treasure vault as mentioned by the Pooped Pirate). He is draped over a large throne-like chair and waves his new treasures around happily while chattering to himself and to passing guests. Every once in a while he sings, "Drink up, me hearties. Yo Ho!" The boats proceed up a lift hill, and Davy Jones' and Blackbeard's voices are alternatively heard, encouraging riders to come back soon. The boats reach the top of the hill and spill back into the sleepy bayou where the journey began, passing by a parrot on a sandbar that can be seen from the queue.

Magic Kingdom

The ride, guarded by the Caribbean watchtower Torre del Sol, is housed in a golden Spanish fort called Castillo Del Morro, inspired by Castillo de San Felipe del Morro in the Old San Juan in Puerto Rico. The queue winds through the fort, passing supplies and cannons, and a pair of pirate skeletons sit at a chessboard. The chess-playing skeletons gag was specifically designed for the Magic Kingdom by Imagineer Marc Davis, who was tasked with designing the ride. There are two queues designed to evoke a different atmosphere, one is the "Soldier" side (the left) and the other is the "Pirate" side (the right, which is now the Lightning Lane queue). Both these queues converge with the loading area known as Pirate's Cove.

Disneyland Paris

The Pirates of the Caribbean ride at Disneyland Paris is housed in a battle-scarred fortress at the back of the park.

The queuing area winds through several courtyards outside before entering the fortress show building. Inside, the queue passes through the dungeons of the fort, offering glimpses of several skeleton pirates, along with a view of the crew's quarters scene from a balcony looking down. The queue then enters the Blue Lagoon area inside the show building, made to feel as though guests are outside at nighttime. The transport system was manufactured by Intamin. After boarding boats from a dock at the base of the fort, riders are sent under an archway and out into the Blue Lagoon, passing by the dining area on the left side and a jungle setting on the right. The boats pass through a shipwreck and enter an old fortress nearby. Inside the fort, gun noises and swordplay are heard in the back as the boats climb up a large lift hill used to haul cargo throughout the building. At the top, riders are given a brief view of the 'Inferno' pirate ship in the harbor below before entering into the depths of the fort. Inside, flames engulf the fort, and the shadows of fighting pirates and soldiers are seen. Up ahead, riders see the pirates in a dungeon trying to coax the key from a guard dog.

The boats go down a waterfall in the side of the fort caused by a cannonball and pass the 'bombarding the fort' scene, which riders have just previously seen from above, where the soldiers and the pirates fire at guests. Entering the relative safety of the town, riders see all the original scenes from the Disneyland version, as well as a new pair of sword-fighting men who duel for a girl in the chase scene, and a projection effect of two pirates chasing a girl around in an upstairs window. The main dialogue of the scenes is in French, with the minor parts in English.  The boats then enter the burning town scene, where the original English vocal tracks are present, singing the theme song.

The boats pass under an archway and enter the arsenal. The supplies are ignited by the fire and explode. Lights flash as an on-ride photo is taken, and the boats go down another drop into darkness. They emerge into the grotto scenes, passing all the skeleton pirate vintages seen at Disneyland, and a new shipwreck scene. Guests also encounter Captain Hector Barbossa, who transforms into a ghastly undead zombie, as he does as a result of his curse in Pirates of the Caribbean: The Curse of the Black Pearl; and Captain Jack Sparrow, sat in a room full of treasure and singing to himself. This part of the ride can be seen from the railroad as it passes through the show building (similar to Splash Mountain at the other parks). 
The skull and crossbones from the original are seen over an archway, issuing a bilingual safety spiel. The boats return to the dock, and riders exit into a themed gift shop where they can purchase their on-ride-photo.

Shanghai Disneyland

 
Unlike other versions of the ride, Pirates of the Caribbean: Battle for the Sunken Treasure uses a storyline based on the eponymous film series. It blends digital large-screen projection technology with traditional set pieces and audio animatronics. Walt Disney Imagineering designed the ride and Industrial Light & Magic created the computer-generated visual effects.

Modifications

The Old Bill scene was originally designed in 1972 for the Magic Kingdom version, but the scene was eventually brought to Disneyland, shortly after the Magic Kingdom version opened in 1973.

The Barker Bird that guarded the entrance of the Magic Kingdom's version was originally installed in the unloading area when the ride opened in 1973. However, the issues with crowd control and congestion in the unloading area led to its placement outside of the entrance in 1975 and the 2006 refurbishment relocated the Barker Bird to the World of Disney Store until 2012.

The loading area of the ride at Walt Disney World originally had a dual loading system with two channels to double the loading capacity. However, safety concerns over the underwater fin that would dispatch the boats resulted in the decision to use a single channel for both loading docks during a refurbishment made in the fall of 1991. As of 2017, both channels exist, but only one is used.

In 1997, the chase scene of the Disneyland original and Magic Kingdom version, which depicted male pirates chasing women (except for the final scene, where the roles were reversed), was altered, now showing the pirates chasing the women in pursuit of food the women were carrying. The "Pooped Pirate" was recast as the "Gluttonous Pirate," a rogue in search of food, while the woman hiding in the barrel was replaced by a cat.

In Jason Surrell's book Pirates of the Caribbean: From The Magic Kingdom to the Movies, showwriter Francis Xavier "X" Atencio referred to these "softening" touches as "Boy Scouts of the Caribbean".

In 2006, the ride was refurbished again, in order to tie it in with the then-new Pirates of the Caribbean: Dead Man's Chest film. This refurbishment saw the addition of Jack Sparrow animatronics to three individual scenes, as well as Captain Barbossa replacing the pirate captain in the battle room and an added waterfall projection of Davy Jones' face in the cave. The "Pooped/Gluttonous Pirate" now held a treasure map in his lap and a magnifying glass in one hand, and other modifications were made to the ride's lighting, audio, dialogue and effects.

To coincide with the release of the 2011 film Pirates of the Caribbean: On Stranger Tides, a projection of Captain Blackbeard from the film (portrayed by original actor Ian McShane) temporarily replaced the 2006 waterfall mist projection of Davy Jones in both the Disneyland and Magic Kingdom versions of the ride, beginning on May 20, 2011.

In late 2012, projections of mermaids swimming alongside the boats and a mermaid skeleton were added to the ride at Disney World. The mermaid projection effect was removed during a refurb in 2015, as it reportedly didn't live up to the designer's expectations.

For the 2013 season, new ride vehicles were added to the Magic Kingdom location.

On April 26, 2017, the Disneyland ride closed during the afternoon to temporarily remove the first Jack Sparrow animatronic hiding behind the dresses, with actor Johnny Depp taking its place, in costume and in character as Jack Sparrow, interacting with guests in real-time live action as they passed by. This was part of a promotion for Pirates of the Caribbean: Dead Men Tell No Tales.

In June 2017, Disney announced that animatronics of Jack Sparrow would be added to two scenes in the Disneyland Paris version. It was also at this time that Disney reincorporated the talking skull at the Magic Kingdom version.

Later that month, Disney announced a change to the auction scene at Disneyland Paris, Disneyland California, and Magic Kingdom, in which the town's women, including the scarlet-clothed redheaded damsel, are auctioned off to the pirates. Instead, the new scene depicts the redhead as a pirate helping the auctioneer sell off loot acquired from the townspeople. The Disneyland Paris version reopened on July 24, 2017, with the changes, while also incorporating the animatronic of Captain Barbossa and projected images of Davy Jones and Blackbeard. The Magic Kingdom version received the new auction scene in March 2018 and Disneyland's version received it in June 2018, after a scheduled refurbishment.

The June 2018 refurbishment at Disneyland also included three changes to the tunnel scene following the treasure room: the mist waterfall (and Davy Jones/Blackbeard narration) was removed entirely, the original 1967 narration by Paul Frees was reinstated, and a scene was added at the end of the cave, depicting a skeleton transforming into a live pirate as the boat passes by.

Adaptations 

In 2003, Disney released Pirates of the Caribbean: The Curse of the Black Pearl, a feature film inspired by the ride starring Johnny Depp as Captain Jack Sparrow in an Oscar-nominated performance. It has been followed by four sequels: Dead Man's Chest (2006), At World's End (2007),  On Stranger Tides (2011), and Dead Men Tell No Tales (2017), with the second installment winning an Oscar for Best Visual Effects in 2007. The series has grossed over US$3.7 billion worldwide. These films included numerous allusions to the ride, most notably the attack on the fort, the famous jail scene, the namesake song, and a few lines from the characters.

At Disneyland and the Magic Kingdom Park of Walt Disney World, the character of Captain Jack Sparrow is occasionally available for photos and autographs, and is further featured in the short show Captain Jack Sparrow's Pirate Tutorial based loosely on the film series. The show is presented in front of or adjacent to the respective park's Pirates of the Caribbean rides and features Captain Jack holding court and enlisting budding pirates to join his crew. Alongside Captain Jack is Mack, his faithful crewman; together they teach the audience how to be a pirate.

A video game by Akella, loosely connected to the first movie's plot, was released to coincide with the film. Worlds based on the Pirates of the Caribbean films appear in the Square Enix games Kingdom Hearts II and Kingdom Hearts III.

In 2000, Pirates of the Caribbean II: Battle for Buccaneer Gold opened at DisneyQuest at Florida's Walt Disney World Resort. On this ride, up to five players board a virtual pirate ship to sail around a small 3-D world. Players may fire cannons at other virtual pirate ships; if opposing ships are sunk, their treasure will be "stolen".

Video game developer Ron Gilbert has often said that the ambience for the Monkey Island video game series was partially inspired by the Disney ride. One obvious homage is the prison scene in Monkey Island 2: LeChuck's Revenge, in which the player needs to retrieve the cell key from a dog using a bone. Although the dog in the scene is named Walt, it is named after game artist Steve Purcell's dog and not after Walt Disney.

On May 25, 2007, Pirate's Lair on Tom Sawyer Island opened at Disneyland park on the existing Tom Sawyer's Island section of the park. It features include new additions to the caves. The island also featured a 20-minute stunt show featuring character Captain Jack Sparrow when it first opened.

Soundtrack

Releases
 The Music of Disneyland, Walt Disney World and Epcot Center "Yo Ho (A Pirate's Life for Me)"
 Classic Disney Volume 5
 Walt Disney World Resort: The Official Album (1999) "Overture" and "Yo Ho (A Pirate's Life for Me)"
 Walt Disney World Resort: Official Album (2000) "Overture" and "Yo Ho (A Pirate's Life for Me)"
 Pirates of the Caribbean (2000) 16-minute "float through," many audio elements from the ride, plus unused music and dialogue
 Walt Disney World Resort Celebrating 100 Years of Magic (2001) "Overture" and "Yo Ho (A Pirate's Life for Me)"
 A Musical History of Disneyland (2005) 16-minute "float through"
 The Official Album of the Disneyland Resort (2005) 5:45
 Disney Sing-Along Songs series

A version of "Yo Ho (A Pirate's Life for Me)" can be heard in several Disney theme park fireworks shows:
 Fantasy in the Sky (Magic Kingdom 1999–2003 version)
 Remember... Dreams Come True
 Celebrate! Tokyo Disneyland
 Disney Enchantment (2022 version; snippets only)

See also 
 List of Disneyland attractions
 List of Magic Kingdom attractions
 List of Tokyo Disneyland attractions

References

Further reading
 Azam.net. Background and History to the Pirates of the Caribbean Rides at Disney Theme Parks [May 2018]
 Surrell, Jason. (2005). Pirates of the Caribbean: From the Magic Kingdom to the Movies. New York: Disney Editions. .
 Theme Park Adventure (Special Pirates of the Caribbean issue) [1999]
 The "E" Ticket No. 32 ( Pirates of the Caribbean issue) [Fall 1999]

External links 
 Disneyland – Pirates of the Caribbean
 Magic Kingdom – Pirates of the Caribbean
 Tokyo Disneyland – Pirates of the Caribbean
 Disneyland Park (Paris) – Pirates of the Caribbean
 Shanghai Disneyland – Pirates of the Caribbean Battle for the Sunken Treasure

Amusement rides introduced in 1967
Amusement rides introduced in 1973
Amusement rides introduced in 1983
Amusement rides introduced in 1992
Pirates of the Caribbean
Walt Disney Parks and Resorts attractions
Amusement rides manufactured by Arrow Dynamics
Amusement rides manufactured by Intamin
Disneyland
Magic Kingdom
Tokyo Disneyland
Disneyland Park (Paris)
Walt Disney Parks and Resorts gentle boat rides
Dark rides
Caribbean in fiction
Louisiana in fiction
Adventureland (Disney)
New Orleans Square (Disneyland)
Audio-Animatronic attractions
Piracy in fiction
Water rides
Water rides manufactured by Arrow Dynamics